Ernest Matthias Alten (December 1, 1894 – September 9, 1981), nicknamed "Lefty", was a Major League Baseball pitcher. Alten played for the Detroit Tigers in the 1920 season. In 14 career games, he had a 0–1 record with a 9.00 ERA. He batted right and threw left-handed.

References

External links

1894 births
1981 deaths
Major League Baseball pitchers
Baseball players from Ohio
Detroit Tigers players
Nashville Vols players
Mobile Bears players
San Francisco Seals (baseball) players
Albany Babies players
Huntington Blue Sox players
Oakland Oaks (baseball) players
Portsmouth Truckers players
Vernon Tigers players
Springfield Reapers players
London Indians players